Deli may refer to:
 Delicatessen, a shop selling specially prepared food, or food prepared by such a shop
 Sultanate of Deli, a former sultanate in North Sumatra, Indonesia

Places
 Deli, Boyer-Ahmad, a village in Kohgiluyeh and Boyer-Ahmad Province, Iran
 Deli, Chaharmahal and Bakhtiari, a village in Chaharmahal and Bakhtiari Province, Iran
 Deli, Isfahan, a village in Isfahan Province, Iran
 Deli, Izeh, a village in Khuzestan Province, Iran
 Deli, Kohgiluyeh, a village in Kohgiluyeh and Boyer-Ahmad Province, Iran
 Deli Serdang Regency, a regency in the province of North Sumatra, Indonesia
 Deli Zal Beyg, a village in Lorestan Province, Iran
 Deli, a town in Sumatra developed for tobacco commerce that became Medan

Other uses
 Deli (company), a global office supply company based in China
 Deli (Ottoman troops), a designation for irregular troops in the later Ottoman Empire
 DeLi Linux, a lightweight Linux distribution
 "Deli" (song), Eurovision Song Contest 2008 entry of Turkey
 Budapest Déli station, a railway station in Hungary

See also
 Delhi (disambiguation)